Néstor Adriel Breitenbruch (born 13 September 1995) is an Argentine professional footballer who plays as a centre-back for Arsenal de Sarandí.

Career
Breitenbruch began his career with Argentine Primera División side Independiente. He made his senior debut in April 2014 during a Copa Argentina match with Santamarina, prior to making his professional debut in the league against Atlético de Rafaela on 10 August. Ten appearances followed over the course of 2014 and 2015. In July 2015, Breitenbruch was loaned to fellow Primera División team Quilmes. However, he returned to Independiente months later without featuring. In January 2018, Breitenbruch joined Liga MX side Tigres UANL. He was immediately loaned to Correcaminos UAT of Ascenso MX.

He scored his first senior goal in his third match for Correcaminos on 13 February versus Cafetaleros de Tapachula. On 28 June 2019, Breitenbruch agreed a move back to Argentina with Godoy Cruz.

Career statistics
.

References

External links

1995 births
Living people
People from Posadas, Misiones
Argentine footballers
Argentine people of German descent
Association football defenders
Argentine expatriate footballers
Expatriate footballers in Mexico
Argentine expatriate sportspeople in Mexico
Primera Nacional players
Argentine Primera División players
Liga MX players
Ascenso MX players
Club Atlético Independiente footballers
Quilmes Atlético Club footballers
Tigres UANL footballers
Correcaminos UAT footballers
Godoy Cruz Antonio Tomba footballers
Defensa y Justicia footballers
Sportspeople from Misiones Province